Cape Hope may refer to:
Places
Cape Hope, Greenland
Cape of Good Hope, South Africa
Cape Hope Islands, Nunavut, Canada
Cape Hedo, Okinawa
Other
Cape Hope squid